Philip Bester and Peter Polansky were the defending champions but decided not to participate.
John Peers and John-Patrick Smith won the final against Divij Sharan and Vishnu Vardhan, 6–2, 6–4.

Seeds

Draw

Draw

References
 Main Draw

McDonald's Burnie International - Doubles
2012 Doubles
2012 in Australian tennis